The Love Mates  is a 1970 French romance film starring Alain Delon and Mireille Darc.

The film was a financial disappointment, with admissions of 508,452 in France.

Plot

Cast 
 Alain Delon as Julien Dandieu 
 Mireille Darc  as Agatha 
 Jane Davenport as  Madly 
 Valentina Cortese  as  Eva
  Pascale de Boysson as  Lucienne 
 Maddly Bamy 	as Madly   
 Maria Schneider

References

External links

1970 films
French romantic drama films
Films produced by Alain Delon
1970s French films